Laurence A. Johnson was an owner of four supermarkets in Syracuse, New York. Johnson and his daughter Eleanor Johnson targeted members of the film and television industries whom he suspected of being Communists during the McCarthy Era. Eleanor assisted her father with mimeographing, mailing, and contacts. In 1951, he and his daughter had a talk with the members of the American Legion Post in Syracuse. With the help of the post Johnson and his daughter soon became a force felt throughout radio and television. He embarked on a one-man "Syracuse Crusade" in the 1950s to force television advertisers to cancel sponsorship of programs in which "suspect" actors appeared. Johnson's pressure tactics were a manifestation of McCarthyism and the Hollywood Blacklist. Their tactics cost untold numbers of television and film their jobs and even their entire careers.

Johnson died shortly after he lost a major court case filed by John Henry Faulk, who lost his radio career because of machinations by Johnson and AWARE, Inc.

External links 
See the January 13, 1991 New York Times article  'If I Stood Up Earlier...' by television producer Mark Goodman. https://query.nytimes.com/gst/fullpage.html?res=9D0CE3DB1339F930A25752C0A967958260&sec=&spon=&pagewanted=3

The Book "Cold War, Cool Medium: Television, McCarthyism, and American Culture" By Thomas Patrick Doherty is available online:

The book "A History of Broadcasting in the United States" by Erik Barnouw

The book "Deadly Farce: Harvey Matusow and the Informer System in the McCarthy Era" by Robert M. Lichtman and Ronald D. Cohen

The Book "Programming for TV, Radio, and Cable" by Edwin T. Vane and Lynne S. Gross

The paper "How the Film and Television Blacklists Worked" by Richard A. Schwartz

The newspaper column "Standing Tall Against McCarthy" By Molly Ivins, Texas Observer. Posted November 29, 2005. http://www.alternet.org/movies/28826/

References

Businesspeople from Syracuse, New York